Robert Henry Barnes (2 October 1849 – January 1916) was a British–German chess player.

He played in Germany, at Frankfurt 1884 (4th scoring 7.5/11); at Frankfurt 1887 (5th DSB Congress, Hauptturnier A, 1st scoring 8/9, and Siegergruppe, 5-6th scoring 1/5); at Leipzig 1894 (9th DSB Congress, Hauptturnier A, 1st scoring 5/5, and Siegergruppe, 3rd-5th scoring 4/7); and won at Eisenach (10th DSB Congress) scoring 10.5/14.

He was an English teacher in Frankfurt and for many years the chairman of the Frankfurt Chess Club. He died in Bad Nauheim in January 1916.

References

External links
Robert Henry Barnes at www.chessgames.com
Robert Henry Barnes at 365Chess.com

1849 births
1916 deaths
19th-century chess players